The Bay Terrace station is a Staten Island Railway station in the neighborhood of Bay Terrace, Staten Island, New York.

History 
The station opened in the early 1900s, as Whitlock. Whitlock was located on Park Place (present-day-Railroad Avenue) in between Washington Avenue (Hopkins Avenue) and Grant Avenue (Spratt Avenue). On December 18, 1912, a public hearing was held by the Public Service Commission (PSC), which among other things, was hearing the Staten Island Rapid Transit Company (SIRT)'s petition to abandon the Whitlock station and replace it with the Bay Terrace station. The movement of the station was done in anticipation of a change in the center of population in the area. The new station was to be built  to the south of the Whitlock station.

On April 13, 1922, the SIRT petitioned to the PSC to move the station  to the east of the station to Lincoln Road and to renamed the station Rice Manor. The PSC denied the application as the move would allow fewer people to use the station. There were 35 homes immediately surrounding the existing station while there were only 3 at the proposed location. The move was intended to spur development in the surrounding area. In 1922, Bay Terrace was made a full-time station. It had previously been closed during part of the year.

Station layout
The station is located on an embankment at Bay Terrace and South Railroad Avenue on the main line. It has an island platform and exits are located at both ends.  During a renovation, the glass windows and exterior staircases were refurbished at both ends.

Exits
The north exit leads to Justin Avenue while the south exit leads to Bay Terrace. Both ends have a street-level underpass, but the one at the south end is pedestrian-only while the north end is for both pedestrians and vehicles. The south end has greenery outside both sides of the underpass. This greenery is maintained by the New York City Parks Department.

References

External links

Staten Island Railway station list
Staten Island Railway general information
 Justin Avenue entrance from Google Maps Street View
 Bay Terrace entrance from Google Maps Street View
Platform from Google Maps Street View

Staten Island Railway stations
Railway stations in the United States opened in 1860
1860 establishments in New York (state)